Salvador Dalí  is a 1966 35-minute film directed by Andy Warhol. The film features surrealist artist Salvador Dalí visiting The Factory and meeting the rock band The Velvet Underground.

See also 
 Andy Warhol filmography

External links 
 Salvador Dalí (1966) at IMDb

Salvador Dalí
The Velvet Underground
Films directed by Andy Warhol
1966 short films
1966 films
1960s American films